Aleksander Zelwerowicz (14 August 1877 in Lublin – 18 June 1955 in Warsaw) was a Polish actor, director, theatre president and a teacher. He received the Order of Polonia Restituta and is one of the Polish Righteous among the Nations.

Aleksander Zelwerowicz State Theatre Academy is named after him.

He is buried at the Powązki Cemetery.

Selected filmography
 Obrona Częstochowy (1913)
 Ochrana warszawska i jej tajemnice (1916)
 Huragan (1928)
 Księżna Łowicka (1932)
 Dzieje grzechu (1933)
 Serce matki (1938)
 Wrzos (1938)
 Doctor Murek (1939)
 The Three Hearts (1939)

External links
 Olga Katafiasz, Legendy polskiego teatru - Aleksander Zelwerowicz, Dziennik Teatralny, 25 July 2001

References

1877 births
1955 deaths
Actors from Lublin
People from Lublin Governorate
Polish theatre directors
Polish male stage actors
Polish male film actors
Polish male silent film actors
19th-century Polish male actors
20th-century Polish male actors
Polish Righteous Among the Nations
Recipients of the Order of Polonia Restituta (1944–1989)
Burials at Powązki Cemetery